Teledeporte (TDP) is a Spanish free-to-air television channel owned and operated by Televisión Española (TVE), the television division of state-owned public broadcaster Radiotelevisión Española (RTVE). It is the corporation's sports television channel, and is known for live broadcast of major Spanish and international sporting events.

It was launched on 12 February 1994 through Hispasat satellite, and was the second sports channel launched in Spain, after Eurosport.

Broadcast rights

National tournaments
 Field hockey
 Liga de Hockey Hierba
 Copa del Rey
 Copa de la Reina de Hockey Hierba
 Road cycling
 Spanish National Road Race Championships
 Rugby union
 División de Honor de Rugby
 Copa del Rey
 Tennis
 Spanish National Tennis Masters
 Volleyball
 Copa del Rey
 Copa de la Reina
 Water polo
 Liga Española
 Copa del Rey''
 Copa de la Reina

International events
Olympic Games
 Summer Olympics
 Winter Olympics (Daily Highlights)

World championships
 IAAF World Championships in Athletics
 FINA World Aquatics Championships
 UCI Road World Championships
 World Gymnastics Championships
 World Men's Handball Championship
 Hockey World Cup
 FIS Alpine Ski World Cup
 FIS Alpine World Ski Championships
 FIVB Beach Volleyball World Championships
 FIVB Volleyball World Championship

European championships
 European Athletics Championships
 European Aquatics Championships
 European Men's Artistic Gymnastics Championships
 European Women's Artistic Gymnastics Championships
 European Men's Artistic Gymnastics Championships
 European Men's Handball Championship
 European Women's Handball Championship
 EuroHockey Nations Championship
 Men's European Volleyball Championship
 Women's European Volleyball Championship
 European Water Polo Championship

International club competitions
 EuroCup Basketball
 Euro Hockey League
 EHF Champions League
 LEN Champions League

Tennis events
 ATP Tour (Madrid Barcelona and Mallorca tournaments only)
 WTA Tour
 Billie Jean King Cup

Road cycling events
 Vuelta a España
 Tour de France
 Giro d'Italia

Motor race events
 Dakar Rally

References

External links
Official Site 
Teledeporte Programme Schedule
Teledeporte at LyngSat Address

RTVE channels
Television stations in Spain
Sports television in Spain
Sports mass media in Spain
Television channels and stations established in 1994
Spanish-language television stations